Santiago Colombatto (born 17 January 1997) is an Argentine professional footballer who plays as a midfielder for Portuguese club Famalicão on loan from the Mexican club León.

Club career 
Colombatto arrived to Buenos Aires from his native Córdoba at age 10. In the Argentine capital, he played for River Plate and Racing Club before moving to Italian club Cagliari on a -year contract in December 2015. He made his Serie B debut on 13 February 2016 against Latina Calcio. He started in the first eleven and was replaced after 49 minutes by Davide Di Gennaro.

In July 2016 he was loaned to Pisa, but on 31 August 2016 he moved to Trapani on loan before the start of the season. On 7 August 2017 Colombatto joined Perugia on a temporary deal. On 16 August 2018, Colombatto joined on Serie B side Hellas Verona on loan with an option to buy.

On 31 August 2019, Colombatto joined Belgian club Sint-Truiden. On 8 Jan 2021, Colombatto joined Mexican side Club León.

On 2 August 2022, Colombatto was loaned by Famalicão in Portugal.

Honours
León
 Leagues Cup: 2021

References

External links

1997 births
Footballers from Córdoba, Argentina
Argentine people of Italian descent
Living people
Argentine footballers
Association football forwards
Cagliari Calcio players
Pisa S.C. players
Trapani Calcio players
A.C. Perugia Calcio players
Hellas Verona F.C. players
Sint-Truidense V.V. players
Club León footballers
F.C. Famalicão players
Serie B players
Belgian Pro League players
Liga MX players
Primeira Liga players
Pan American Games medalists in football
Pan American Games gold medalists for Argentina
Footballers at the 2019 Pan American Games
Medalists at the 2019 Pan American Games
Olympic footballers of Argentina
Footballers at the 2020 Summer Olympics
Argentine expatriate footballers
Expatriate footballers in Italy
Argentine expatriate sportspeople in Italy
Expatriate footballers in Belgium
Argentine expatriate sportspeople in Belgium
Expatriate footballers in Mexico
Argentine expatriate sportspeople in Mexico
Expatriate footballers in Portugal
Argentine expatriate sportspeople in Portugal